Jigme Tshering Dorji (also spelled as Dorjee) is a Bhutanese international footballer. He made his first appearance for the Bhutan national football team in 2011.

Career statistics

International goals

References

1995 births
Living people
Bhutanese footballers
Bhutan international footballers
Association football defenders